Pebekkamen was an ancient Egyptian official during the reign of pharaoh Ramesses III of the 20th Dynasty. Along with Ramesses' secondary wife Tiye and the official Mesedsure, he was a primary organizer of the Harem conspiracy in 1155 BC. The conspirators intended to assassinate Ramesses and place Pentawer, her and Ramesses' son, on the throne instead of his elder half-brother Ramesses IV.

The Judicial Papyrus of Turin indicates that prior to his arrest, Pebekkamen had served as "chief of the chamber" to Ramesses. Like the names of many other conspirators mentioned in the Judicial Papyrus, "Pebekkamen" is actually a pejorative pseudonym reflecting his execrable behaviour; his true name is never revealed.

Of his crimes, the court records state:
He was brought in because of his collusion with Tiy and the women of the harem. He made common cause with them, and began bringing out their words to their mothers and their brothers who were there, saying: "Stir up the people! Incite enemies to hostility against their lord." He was placed before the great nobles of the court of examination; they examined his crimes; they found that he had committed them. His crimes seized him; the nobles who examined him brought his judgment upon him.
Following his trial, Pebekkamen was executed by burning, a method which carried particular stigma as it was believed to prevent the executed from progressing to the afterlife.

In modern popular culture
Pebekkamen appears as a Great Spy in the turn-based strategy computer game Civilization IV.

References

 online translation The Judicial Turin Papyrus

People executed for treason
Executed ancient Egyptian people
Pseudonyms
12th-century BC deaths
People executed by ancient Egypt
People executed by Egypt by burning
Year of birth unknown
2nd-millennium BC executions